Joseph-Rodolphe Ouimet (16 November 1878 – 21 August 1948) was a Liberal party member of the House of Commons of Canada. He was born in L'Île-Bizard, Quebec and became a notary.

The son of Adolphe Ouimet and Clephire Nantel, he was educated at the Collège Sainte-Marie de Montréal and entered practice as a notary in Saint-Polycarpe. In 1905, Ouimet married Hortense Mousseau, the sister of Joseph-Octave Mousseau.

He was elected to Parliament at the Vaudreuil—Soulanges riding in a by-election on 21 March 1922. After serving for the remainder of the 14th Canadian Parliament, Ouimet left federal politics and did not seek another term in the 1925 election.

References

External links
 

1878 births
1948 deaths
Liberal Party of Canada MPs
Members of the House of Commons of Canada from Quebec
People from L'Île-Bizard–Sainte-Geneviève